The following highways are numbered 496:

United States
  Interstate 496